Macclesfield Hibel Road railway station was a railway station serving the town of Macclesfield in Cheshire, England. Built right at the point where the track of the two companies made an end-on junction, the station was managed by a joint committee of the two companies.

With the opening of the Macclesfield, Bollington and Marple Railway in 1871, the NSR opened a new station less than  further south called Macclesfield Central.  It had been hoped that the new line could run into Hibel Road, but the LNWR objected to this and neither would the LNWR agree to share Central station.

Both stations remained open until 1960, when the decision was taken by British Rail to concentrate services on a redeveloped Central station.  The refurbished Central station, now renamed simply Macclesfield, opened on 7 November 1960; the same day that Hibel Road closed.  The site of Hibel Road station has now been redeveloped.

Passenger train services
LNWR services to/from  terminated at Hibel Road but, if they continued to  via , then many stopped at Central too. NSR services, either on the main line to Stoke or via the Churnet Valley line, used both stations.

Freight traffic
The area around the station was very cramped. To the south of the station was the NSR goods yard, which dealt mostly with coal for Macclesfield gas works.  North of the station was the LNWR goods yard and the NSR motive power depot (MPD).  As the track north of the station was LNWR owned, the NSR could only access its engine shed using running powers over the LNWR track.

Notes

References

Disused railway stations in Cheshire
Former London and North Western Railway stations
Railway stations in Great Britain opened in 1849
Railway stations in Great Britain closed in 1960
Former North Staffordshire Railway stations
1849 establishments in England
Macclesfield